Georgios Stefanopoulos (born March 31, 1962 in Peristeri, Attiki) is a former boxer from Greece, who participated in two Summer Olympics for his native country in the men's heavyweight division (– 91 kg), starting in 1984 in Los Angeles, California. He twice won a medal at the European Championships in the early 1990s.  Georgios also had some success in kickboxing, winning a gold medal in the Full-Contact heavyweight category at the W.A.K.O. European Championships 1986.

References

1962 births
Boxers at the 1984 Summer Olympics
Boxers at the 1992 Summer Olympics
Heavyweight boxers
Living people
Olympic boxers of Greece
Greek male boxers
Mediterranean Games silver medalists for Greece
Mediterranean Games bronze medalists for Greece
Competitors at the 1987 Mediterranean Games
Competitors at the 1991 Mediterranean Games
Mediterranean Games medalists in boxing
Sportspeople from Athens